An election for Members of the European Parliament representing Netherlands constituency for the 1979–1984 term of the European Parliament was held on 7 June 1979. It was part of the wider 1979 European election.

Electorate system
The ten seats were elected using proportional representation, with seats allocated using the D'Hondt method.

Voting rights were given to all citizens who were allowed to vote in Dutch parliament elections, Dutch citizens resident in other member states and did not already have voting rights for the Dutch Parliament elections and citizens of other member states who lived in the Netherlands, provided their home country granted similar rights.

Campaign

The Labour Party and Political Party of Radicals formed an electoral alliance.

Results

Dutch political parties 
Four parties were able to win seats: the conservative liberal VVD, the progressive liberal D66, the Christian-democratic CDA and the social-democratic Labour Party. Five other nationally represented parties compete but are unable to win seats. 58.12% of the Dutch population turned out on election day.

European groups 

| style="text-align:center;" colspan="11" | 
|-
|style="background-color:#E9E9E9;text-align:center;vertical-align:top;" colspan="3"|European group
!style="background-color:#E9E9E9" |Seats 1979
|-
| 
| style="text-align:left;" | European People's Party
| style="text-align:left;" | EPP
| style="text-align:right;" | 10
|-
| 
| style="text-align:left;" | Confederation of Socialist Parties
| style="text-align:left;" | SOC
| style="text-align:right;" | 9
|-
| style="background-color:gold;" width=0.3em|
| style="text-align:left;" | European Liberal Democrats
| style="text-align:left;" | LD
| style="text-align:right;" | 4
|-
| 
| style="text-align:left;" | Non-Inscrits
| style="text-align:left;" | NI
| style="text-align:right;" | 2
|-
|width="350" style="text-align:right;background-color:#E9E9E9" colspan="3"|
|width="30" style="text-align:right;background-color:#E9E9E9"|25
|}

Elected members 
Christian Democratic Appeal
Bouke Beumer (top candidate)
Elise Boot
Frans van der Gun
Jim Janssen van Raaij
Sjouke Jonker
Hanja Maij-Weggen
Harrij Notenboom
Jean Penders
Teun Tolman
Wim Vergeer

Labour Party
Wim Albers
Bob Cohen
Piet Dankert
Annie Krouwel-Vlam
Johan van Minnen
Hemmo Muntingh
Anne Vondeling (top candidate)
Eisso Woltjer
Ien van den Heuvel-de Blank

People's Party for Freedom and Democracy
Cees Berkhouwer (top candidate)
Aart Geurtsen
Hendrik Jan Louwes
Hans Nord

Democrats 66
Suzanne Dekker
Aar de Goede (top candidate)

MEPs period 1979–1984
Below is a complete list of members of the European Parliament for the period 1979–1984 as a result of this election.

References 

Netherlands
European Parliament elections in the Netherlands
1979 elections in the Netherlands